Events in the year 1972 in Japan. It corresponds to Shōwa 47 (昭和47年) in the Japanese calendar.

Incumbents 
Emperor: Hirohito
Prime minister: Eisaku Satō (Liberal Democratic) until July 7, Kakuei Tanaka (Liberal Democratic)
Chief Cabinet Secretary: Noboru Takeshita until July 7, Susumu Nikaido
Chief Justice of the Supreme Court: Kazuto Ishida
President of the House of Representatives: Naka Funada until November 13, Umekichi Nakamura from December 22
President of the House of Councillors: Kenzō Kōno

Governors
Aichi Prefecture: Mikine Kuwahara 
Akita Prefecture: Yūjirō Obata 
Aomori Prefecture: Shunkichi Takeuchi 
Chiba Prefecture: Taketo Tomonō 
Ehime Prefecture: Haruki Shiraishi 
Fukui Prefecture: Heidayū Nakagawa 
Fukuoka Prefecture: Hikaru Kamei 
Fukushima Prefecture: Morie Kimura
Gifu Prefecture: Saburō Hirano 
Gunma Prefecture: Konroku Kanda 
Hiroshima Prefecture: Iduo Nagano 
Hokkaido: Naohiro Dōgakinai 
Hyogo Prefecture: Tokitada Sakai
Ibaraki Prefecture: Nirō Iwakami 
Ishikawa Prefecture: Yōichi Nakanishi 
Iwate Prefecture: Tadashi Chida 
Kagawa Prefecture: Masanori Kaneko 
Kagoshima Prefecture: Saburō Kanemaru 
Kanagawa Prefecture: Bunwa Tsuda 
Kochi Prefecture: Masumi Mizobuchi 
Kumamoto Prefecture: Issei Sawada 
Kyoto Prefecture: Torazō Ninagawa 
Mie Prefecture: Satoru Tanaka (until 7 November); Ryōzō Tagawa (starting 24 December)
Miyagi Prefecture: Sōichirō Yamamoto 
Miyazaki Prefecture: Hiroshi Kuroki 
Nagano Prefecture: Gon'ichirō Nishizawa 
Nagasaki Prefecture: Kan'ichi Kubo 
Nara Prefecture: Ryozo Okuda 
Niigata Prefecture: Shiro Watari
Oita Prefecture: Masaru Taki 
Okayama Prefecture: Takenori Kato (until 11 November); Shiro Nagano (starting 12 November)
Okinawa Prefecture: Chōbyō Yara (starting 15 May)
Osaka Prefecture: Ryōichi Kuroda 
Saga Prefecture: Sunao Ikeda 
Saitama Prefecture: Hiroshi Kurihara (until 12 July); Yawara Hata (starting 13 July)
Shiga Prefecture: Kinichiro Nozaki 
Shiname Prefecture: Seiji Tsunematsu 
Shizuoka Prefecture: Yūtarō Takeyama 
Tochigi Prefecture: Nobuo Yokokawa 
Tokushima Prefecture: Yasunobu Takeichi 
Tokyo: Ryōkichi Minobe 
Tottori Prefecture: Jirō Ishiba 
Toyama Prefecture: Kokichi Nakada 
Wakayama Prefecture: Masao Ohashi 
Yamagata Prefecture: Tōkichi Abiko 
Yamaguchi Prefecture: Masayuki Hashimoto 
Yamanashi Prefecture: Kunio Tanabe

Events 
January 24 - Two hunters discover Yokoi Shōichi, a former lieutenant in the Imperial Japanese Army who lived in a cave in Guam for 28 years after the end of World War II. Upon his return to Japan on February 2, he proclaimed, "it is with much shame that I return."
February 3–13 - The 1972 Winter Olympics are held in Sapporo, Hokkaido.
February 19-28 – Asama-Sanso incident occurs in Karuizawa, Nagano Prefecture.
May 12 – Industrial robot brand, Fanuc was founded in Yamanashi Prefecture.
May 13 - A fire at the Sennichi Department Store in Osaka kills 118, injures 78.
May 15 - Okinawa returned to Japan after being occupied by the United States military for 27 years.
July 3 to 13 - A heavy torrential rain with debris flow hit Kyushu and Shikoku area, according to Fire and Disaster Management official confirmed report, 447 people were killed, while another 1056 person were injured.
July 21 – MOS Burger was founded.    
November 6 - An express passenger train caught fire in Hokuriku Rail Tunnel in Tsuruga, Fukui Prefecture, according to Japan Transport Ministry official confirmed report, 31 lives were lost, and 714 people were injured.
December 10 - General election of 1972 - Liberal Democratic Party win 271 out of 491 seats.

Births 

January 7 – Tamakasuga Ryōji, sumo wrestler
January 8 – Ryō Tamura, comedian
January 10 – Shuntaro Furukawa, businessman
January 13
Yukiko Iwai, voice actress
Akinori Otsuka, baseball pitcher
January 17 – Ken Hirai, singer-songwriter
January 22 - Romi Park, voice actress
January 24 – Junko Kubo, announcer and presenter
January 28 – Tsuyoshi Shinjo, baseball player
January 29 – Masaru Hamaguchi, comedian 
February 2 – Hisashi Tonomura, musician
February 5 – Koriki Chōshū, comedian
February 7 – Akiko Suwanai, violinist
February 8 – Hiroshi Tsuchida, actor and voice actor
February 17 - Yuki Isoya, singer
March 10 - Takashi Fujii (Matthew Minami), television performer
March 29 - Junichi Suwabe, voice actor
April 5 - Junko Takeuchi, voice actress
April 30 - Takako Tokiwa, voice actress
May 6 - Naoko Takahashi, long-distance runner
May 21 - Kaoru Fujino, voice actress
May 30 - Sōichirō Hoshi, voice actor
July 1 – Tetsu Inada, voice actor
July 5 - Tatsuhito Takaiwa, Zainichi-Korean wrestler
July 8 - Shōsuke Tanihara, actor
July 14 - Masami Suzuki, voice actress
July 19 – Naohito Fujiki, actor and singer 
July 27
Takako Fuji, actress
Takashi Shimizu, director
August 3 - Atsunori Inaba, baseball coach and former player 
August 14 - Takako Honda, voice actress
August 20 - Anna Umemiya, model
September 8 - Tomokazu Seki, voice actor
September 10 - Rio Tahara, snowboarder
September 20 – Sawa Suzuki, actress
September 29 – Taizo Son, entrepreneur and investor
October 9 - Kōki Miyata, voice actor
October 19 - Sayaka Aoki, voice actress
October 21 - Masakazu Morita, voice actor
October 29 - Takafumi Horie, entrepreneur
November 1 - Naoki Yanagi, voice actor
November 9 - Naomi Shindou, voice actor
November 13 - Takuya Kimura, member of SMAP and actor
December 3 - Saki Takaoka, actress
December 4 - Yūko Miyamura, voice actress and singer
December 12 - Arihito Muramatsu, baseball player
December 13 - Jun Itoda, comedian
December 14 - Kiriko Nananan, manga artist
December 18 - Shinji Takeda, actor
December 19 - Hideki Niwa, politician
December 20 - Takeshi Rikio, professional wrestler
December 22 - Takayuki Yokoyama, football player
December 28 - Shinobu Terajima, actress

Deaths 
February 17 – Taiko Hirabayashi, writer (b. 1905)
April 16 - Yasunari Kawabata, writer, Nobel Prize laureate (b. 1899)
August 26 - Goroku Amemiya, photographer (b. 1886)

See also
 1972 in Japanese television
 List of Japanese films of 1972

References

 
Japan
Years of the 20th century in Japan